Diário Insular (Island Daily) is Portuguese newspaper, published daily from Angra do Heroísmo, island of Terceira in the archipelago of the Azores.

History

Founded in 1946, by Cândido Pamplona Forjaz, who was director from 1962 to 1974, Diário Insular was decidedly-associated with the Estado Novo regime of António Oliveira de Salazar. Yet, during this period, the publication was censured by the Salazar government for commentaries or reports that contradicted the regime.

Diário Insular is owned by Sociedade Terceirense de Publicidade, under daily management of director José Lourenço.

References

External links

 Official website

1946 establishments in Portugal
Mass media in the Azores
Mass media in Ponta Delgada
Diário Insular, O
Newspapers established in 1946
Portuguese-language newspapers